An Accidental Memory in the Case of Death is the second album from Portland, Oregon ambient musician Matthew Cooper, under the name Eluvium. Strikingly different from his previous work, An Accidental Memory in the Case of Death features Cooper playing solo piano only. It was recorded in one continuous take and was completed in two hours. The artwork for the album was created by Jeannie L. Paske.

Track listing
 "An Accidental Memory" - 1:12
 "Genius and the Thieves" - 2:26
 "Perfect Neglect in a Field of Statues" - 5:25
 "Nepenthe" - 3:42
 "In a Sense" - 1:45
 "The Well-Meaning Professor" - 7:34
 "An Accidental Memory in the Case of Death" - 4:26

References

2004 albums
Eluvium (musician) albums
Temporary Residence Limited albums